The Crystallography Open Database (COD) is a database of crystal structures. Unlike similar crystallography databases, the database is entirely open-access, with registered users able to contribute published and unpublished structures of small molecules and small to medium sized unit cell crystals to the database. As of May 2016, the database has more than 360,000 entries. The database has various contributors, and contains Crystallographic Information Files as defined by the International Union of Crystallography (IUCr). There are currently five sites worldwide that mirror this database. The 3D structures of compounds can be converted to input files for 3D printers.

See also
 Crystallography
 Crystallographic database

References

External links
 http://www.crystallography.net
 http://cod.ibt.lt/
 https://archive.today/20130714225104/http://cod.ensicaen.fr/
 http://qiserver.ugr.es/cod/
 http://nanocrystallography.org
 http://nanocrystallography.research.pdx.edu/search/codmirror/
 http://nanocrystallography.research.pdx.edu
 https://crystallography.io/

Crystallographic databases
Biological databases